Raoul Servais (1 May 1928 – 17 March 2023) was a Belgian filmmaker, animator, and comics artist. He was born in Ostend, Belgium, and is a fundamental figure of the Belgian animation scene, as well as the founder of the animation faculty of the Royal Academy of Fine Arts (KASK).
 Servais received the Lifetime Achievement Award at the World Festival of Animated Film - Animafest Zagreb in 2016. In total, Servais received about 60 film prizes. Homages with retrospectives were organized in Paris, Madrid, Istanbul, Montreal, New York, Tokyo, Hong Kong, Rio de Janeiro and St Petersburg. He is best known for the 1979 animated film, Harpya for which he won a Palme d'Or at the Cannes Film Festival. At the 9th Magritte Awards, he received an Honorary Magritte Award from the Académie André Delvaux.

He died 17 March 2023 at his home in Leffinge.

Filmography
 1960: Harbour Lights  (Royal Academy of Fine Arts, Ghent)
 1963: 
 1965: 
 1968: Siren
 1969: Goldframe
 1970: To Speak or Not to Speak
 1971: Operation X-70
 1973: Pegasus
 1976: Halewyn's Song
 1979: Harpya (Palme d'Or for Best Short Film at the 1979 Cannes Film Festival)
 1994: Taxandria (Diploma of Merit at the 4th Kecskemét Animation Film Festival
 1998: 
 2001: 
 2005: Winter Days (3' sequence)
 2016: Tank

See also
 Cinema of Belgium

References

Further reading

External links
 
 Lambiek Comiclopedia biography about Raoul Servais.
 

1928 births
2023 deaths
Belgian animators
Belgian film directors
Belgian comics artists
Belgian animated film directors
Belgian animated film producers
Flemish film people
International Animated Film Association
Artists from Ostend
Members of the Royal Flemish Academy of Belgium for Science and the Arts
Magritte Award winners